Emmett Reid Dunn (November 21, 1894 in Alexandria, Virginia – February 13, 1956) was an American herpetologist noted for his work in Panama and for studies of salamanders in the Eastern United States.

Biography
He attended Haverford College as an undergraduate and received his PhD from Harvard University. After receiving his PhD, he taught at Smith College. He left Smith to study on a Guggenheim Fellowship, following which he became a professor of biology at Haverford College. He was also curator of reptiles and amphibians at the Academy of Natural Sciences, Philadelphia.   He served as editor of Copeia from 1924 to 1929.

Eponyms
A number of reptiles were named in honor of Dunn, both species (binomials) and subspecies (trinomials), including the following.

Species:
Anolis dunni H.M. Smith, 1936 – Dunn's anole
Atractus dunni Savage, 1955 – Dunn's ground snake
Geophis dunni K.P. Schmidt, 1932 – Dunn's earth snake
Hydromorphus dunni Slevin, 1942 – Dunn's water snake
Kinosternon dunni K.P. Schmidt, 1947 – Colombian mud turtle
Micrablepharus dunni  – Dunn's tinyfoot teiid, a synonym of Micrablepharus maximiliani 
Porthidium dunni (Hartweg & J.A. Oliver, 1938) – Dunn's hognose pitviper
Sibon dunni J.A. Peters, 1957 – Dunn's snail sucker
Sinonatrix dunni , a synonym of Natrix tessellata 
Sphaerodactylus dunni K.P. Schmidt, 1936 – Dunn's least gecko

Subspecies:
Liasis mackloti dunni Stull, 1932 – Wetar python
Mastigodryas boddaerti dunni (L.C. Stuart, 1933) – Dunn's tropical racer
Micrurus dissoleucus dunni Barbour, 1923 – Dunn's pygmy coral snake

This author abbreviation is not to be confused with Dunn in botany, where it refers to Stephen Troyte Dunn.

See also
 :Category:Taxa named by Emmett Reid Dunn

References

External links

.

1894 births
1956 deaths
American herpetologists
American taxonomists
20th-century American zoologists
Haverford College alumni
Harvard University alumni
Smith College faculty
People from Alexandria, Virginia
Scientists from Virginia